In computer science, the Hunt–Szymanski algorithm, also known as Hunt–McIlroy algorithm, is a solution to the longest common subsequence problem. It was one of the first non-heuristic algorithms used in diff which compares a pair of files each represented as a sequence of lines. To this day, variations of this algorithm are found in incremental version control systems, wiki engines, and molecular phylogenetics research software.

History 
The algorithm was proposed by Harold S. Stone as a generalization of a special case solved by Thomas G. Szymanski. James W. Hunt refined the idea, implemented the first version of the candidate-listing algorithm used by diff and embedded it into an older framework of Douglas McIlroy.

The description of the algorithm appeared as a technical report by Hunt and McIlroy in 1976. The following year, a variant of the algorithm was finally published in a joint paper by Hunt and Szymanski.

Algorithm
The Hunt–Szymanski algorithm is a modification to a basic solution for the longest common subsequence problem which has complexity . The solution is modified so that there are lower time and space requirements for the algorithm when it is working with typical inputs.

Basic longest common subsequence solution

Algorithm
Let  be the th element of the first sequence.

Let  be the th element of the second sequence.

Example

 contains three elements:

 contains three elements:

The steps that the above algorithm would perform to determine the length of the longest common subsequence for both sequences are shown in the diagram. The algorithm correctly reports that the longest common subsequence of the two sequences is two elements long.

Complexity

Essential matches

-candidates
The Hunt–Szymanski algorithm only considers what the authors call essential matches, or -candidates. -candidates are pairs of indices  such that:

The second point implies two properties of -candidates:
 There is a common subsequence of length  in the first  elements of sequence  and the first  elements of sequence .
 There are no common subsequences of length  for any fewer than  elements of sequence  or  elements of sequence .

Connecting -candidates

To create the longest common subsequence from a collection of -candidates, a grid with each sequence's contents on each axis is created. The -candidates are marked on the grid.

This is illustrated in the adjacent diagram.

Black dots represent candidates that would have to be considered by the simple algorithm and the black lines are connections that create common subsequences of length 3.

Red dots represent -candidates that are considered by the Hunt–Szymanski algorithm and the red line is the connection that creates a common subsequence of length 3.

See also
 Levenshtein distance
 Longest common subsequence problem
 Wagner–Fischer algorithm

References

Algorithms on strings
Combinatorics
Dynamic programming